The 2014 PSL Grand Prix was the second tournament of the Philippine Super Liga for its 2014 season. The tournament ran from October 18, 2014 to November 30, 2014. The tournament's major sponsor was Asics. FIVB Referees Commission director Mohammed Hassan was the guest of honor of the opening ceremony held in Smart-Araneta Coliseum.

For this tournament, several teams took leave from the league, due to their participation in the Reinforced Open Conference (Season 11) of the Shakey's V-League, which coincided with the tournament - namely, the Philippine Army Lady Troopers (defending women's division champion), the Cagayan Valley Lady Rising Suns, the PLDT Home TVolution Power Attackers and the Instituto Estetico Manila Phoenix Volley Masters.

New teams for this conference were the Foton Tornadoes (women's), the Mane 'n Tail Lady Stallions (women's) and the Fourbees Cavite Patriots Total Attackers (men's). The former AirAsia Flying Spikers became the Generika Lifesavers after the pullout of AirAsia Philippines. In the men's division, the Maybank Tigers returned for this conference, while the Systema Active Smashers played as the "BENCH/ Systema Active Smashers" (in partnership with clothing retailer, BENCH/).

The champions of this tournament - the Petron Blaze Spikers (women's) and the Cignal HD Spikers (men's) - will represent the Philippines in the 2015 AVC Club Volleyball Championships.

Women's division

Classification round

|}

 

|}

Final round

Rank 5
 

|}

Semifinals
 

|}

3rd-place match

|}

Finals

|}

Final standing

Men's division

Classification round

|}

|}
* forfeit

Playoffs

Semi-finals

|}

3rd place

|}

Men's Finals

|}

Final standing

Awards

Team uniforms

For the women's division, the color combination of each team's uniforms deviated from its respective brand colors.

Venues
Smart Araneta Coliseum – opening day
Cuneta Astrodome
Santo Domingo Coliseum
Muntinlupa Sports Complex
Alonte Sports Arena

Broadcast partner
Solar Sports

References

Philippine Super Liga
PSL
PSL